Lian Bichsel (born May 18, 2004) is a Swiss professional ice hockey defenceman playing for Leksands IF of the Swedish Hockey League (SHL) as a prospect of the Dallas Stars of the National Hockey League (NHL). Bichsel was drafted in the first round, 18th overall, by the Stars in the 2022 NHL Entry Draft.

Playing career
Bichsel originally played as a youth in his native Switzerland with hometown club EHC Olten's junior ranks. Moving to EHC Biel-Bienne from the under-15 level, Bichsel showed promising development for his size within his three seasons within the club. 

Bichsel made his professional senior debut in the Swiss National League with EHC Biel during the 2020–21 season, featuring in 4 games.

In order to continue his upward trajectory, Bichsel moved from Switzerland to the more competitive Swedish J20 Nationell, by agreeing to a contract with the junior club of Leksands IF on 24 May 2021. In the following 2021–22 season, Bichsel was soon elevated to make his Swedish Hockey League debut and was later rewarded with a two-year rookie contract through 2023 with Leksands on 21 January 2022. He finished his first season in the league in posting 1 goal and 3 points through 29 games.

On 7 July 2022, Bichsel's impressive season was acknowledged by his selection by the Dallas Stars in the first-round, 18th overall, of the 2022 NHL Entry Draft. Returning to Sweden for his final season under contract with Leksands in the 2022–23 season, Bichsel continued his development, featuring primarily in a third-pairing role on the blueline alongside veteran Jonas Ahnelöv.

Career statistics

Regular season and playoffs

International

References

External links

2004 births
Living people
EHC Biel players
Dallas Stars draft picks
Leksands IF players
National Hockey League first-round draft picks
People from Olten
Swiss ice hockey defencemen